ABT-239 is an H3-receptor inverse agonist developed by Abbott. It has stimulant and nootropic effects, and has been investigated as a treatment for ADHD, Alzheimer's disease, and schizophrenia. ABT-239 is more active at the human H3 receptor than comparable agents such as thioperamide, ciproxifan, and cipralisant. It was ultimately dropped from human trials after showing the dangerous cardiac side effect of QT prolongation, but is still widely used in animal research into H3 antagonists / inverse agonists.

References

External links
 

Nootropics
H3 receptor antagonists
Benzonitriles
Benzofuranethanamines
Pyrrolidines
Biphenyls